The 9th Biathlon European Championships were held in Kontiolahti, Finland, from March 6 to March 10, 2002. It was the second time Kontiolahti hosted European Championships after it did so in 1994.

There were total of 16 competitions held: sprint, pursuit, individual and relay both for U26 and U21.

Results

U26

Men's

Women's

U21

Men's

Women's

Medal table

External links 
 IBU full results
 All results

Biathlon European Championships
International sports competitions hosted by Finland
2002 in biathlon
2002 in Finnish sport
Biathlon competitions in Finland